Yantang Town is an urban town in Chaling County, Hunan Province, People's Republic of China.

Cityscape
The town is divided into 32 villages and 1 community, the following areas: Xinjie Community, Zhangshi Village, Kanxia Village, Helei Village, Gaoxing Village, Wanli Village, Jingtou Village, Longshang Village, Gantang Village, Zhongbao Village, Shangwan Village, Meitian Village, Tangjing Village, Tianxin Village, Hexin Village, Zhuping Village, Youzui Village, Shaxi Village, Ranyang Village, Shajiang Village, Huangqian Village, Changjiang Village, Longli Village, Yaoshi Village, Huamu Village, Quanshan Village, Nan'an Village, Lianxin Village, Daixi Village, Shansi Village, Aili Village, Shuanglong Village, and Gaojin Village.

References

External links

Divisions of Chaling County